Dolichoderus heeri is a recently discovered extinct species of Miocene ant in the genus Dolichoderus. Described by Dlussky and Putyatina in 2014, the fossils were found in Radoboj in Croatia.

References

†
Miocene insects
Prehistoric insects of Europe
Fossil taxa described in 2014
Fossil ant taxa
Paleontology in Croatia